Tatria iunii is a species of tapeworm in the family Amabiliidae.

It is a parasite of the little grebe and has been reported from Poland.

References

Cestoda
Animal parasites of vertebrates
Animals described in 1974